HD 114783 is a star with two exoplanetary companions in the equatorial constellation of Virgo. With an apparent visual magnitude of 7.56 it is too faint to be visible with the unaided eye, but is an easy target for binoculars. Based on parallax measurements, it is located at a distance of 68.7 light years from the Sun, but is drifting closer with a radial velocity of −12 km/s.

This is an orange-hued K-type main-sequence star with a stellar classification of K1V It is roughly 2.5 billion years old and is chromospherically inactive with a low projected rotational velocity of 1.9 km/s. The star has 88% of the mass and 81% of the radius of the Sun. It is radiating 42% of the luminosity of the Sun from its photosphere at an effective temperature of 5,114 K.

In 2001, the California and Carnegie Planet Search team found an extrasolar planet orbiting the star using the radial velocity method. The discovery was made with the Keck Telescope. A second companion was discovered in 2010.

See also
 HD 114386
 List of extrasolar planets

References

K-type main-sequence stars
Planetary systems with two confirmed planets

Virgo (constellation)
Durchmusterung objects
3769
114783
064457